Rita Orji is a Nigerian-Canadian computer scientist who is a Canada Research Chair in Persuasive Technology and the Director of the Persuasive Computing Lab at Dalhousie University. Her work is in the area of human–computer interaction with a major focus on designing interactive systems to achieve health and well being objectives. She has won over 70 awards and recognitions from both national and international organizations. She has addressed a United Nations panel about the status of women and at the Parliament of Canada.

Early life and education 
Orji grew up in Enugu State Nigeria. She is Igbo by tribe. She was raised by parents, Maria and Okonkwo Orji, who never attended school, in a remote town called Owelli with no electricity and pipe-borne water. She is one of nine siblings and her parents supported the family through peasant farming. Orji did not have access to a computer growing up, and was admitted to study Computer Science at Nnamdi Azikiwe University without having used a computer. She graduated top of her class with First Class Honours. During her secondary education, she entered the Nigerian team for the International Mathematical Olympiad. In 2002, she launched "Education for Women and the Less Privileged in Nigeria", a nonprofit organisation that provides mentorship and scholarships for women in education. Orji joined a master's program at Middle East Technical University, where she was the only African student in class. She completed her master's in 2009 and moved to Canada as a graduate student.

In 2012, Orji presented at the Parliament of Canada, where she spoke about health promotion and disease prevention. She was awarded a Vanier scholarship from the Natural Sciences and Engineering Research Council. Orji earned her PhD at University of Saskatchewan in 2014. She was the first woman from her town of 50,000 people to earn a PhD. She joined McGill University as a postdoctoral fellow, where she worked on technological interventions that can effect behavioural change.

Career 
Orji joined the Games Institute at the University of Waterloo as a Banting Fellow in 2016. She is interested in persuasive technology and how to design technologies that can promote health and wellness and technologies for promoting social and public goods. Orji joined the Faculty of Computer Science at Dalhousie University as an assistant professor in 2017. She designs interactive systems and persuasive technologies, particularly to benefit under-served populations. She has studied how culture and age influence the efficacy of persuasive technologies. She analysed how reward, competition, social comparison and social learning differ between men and women in collectivist and individualist cultures, finding that in collectivist cultures, men are more susceptible to reward and competition.

Advocacy and engagement 
Orji is a Science, Technology, Engineering, and Mathematics (STEM) diversity ambassador, working towards increased participation of women and minorities in computing, including using herself as a practical example. She is passionate about youth empowerment and women's access to education. She was honoured by hEr VOLUTION as one of the top 150 women scientists in Canada. She attended the UN Commission on the Status of Women in New York City. She spoke at the 2018 United Nations Commission on the Status of Women (CSW62) Panel: It is Up to Me.

Awards and honours 
2013 University of Saskatchewan Research Excellence in Science Award/
2017 Enugu State Award of Excellence in Recognition of Scholarly Achievement and Contributions to Advancement of Education
2017 Nnamdi Azikiwe University Award of Excellence in Recognition of Contribution for the Advancement of Knowledge in Computer Science.
2017 Top 150 Canadian Women in Science, Technology, Engineering, and Mathematics (STEM)
2018 Women Leaders in the Digital Economy Award, Digital Nova Scotia.
2019 Dalhousie University President's Research Excellence Award.
2019 International Society for Research on Internet Interventions Rising Star Award.
2020 Canada Research Chair in Persuasive Technology.
2020 Inducted into the Royal Society of Canada College of New Scholars, Artists and Scientists.
2021 Top 100 Canada's Most Powerful Women 
2021 Top 100 Leading Nigerian Women 
2021 Top 25 Canadian Immigrant Awards
2021 Outstanding Young Computer Science Researcher Awards 
2022 Admitted into the Global Young Academy
2022 100 Accomplished Black Canadian Women

References

External links
 

Year of birth missing (living people)
Living people
Canadian women computer scientists
Nigerian women computer scientists
Canadian computer scientists
Nigerian computer scientists
Nnamdi Azikiwe University alumni
Middle East Technical University alumni
University of Saskatchewan alumni
Academic staff of the Dalhousie University
Human–computer interaction researchers
Nigerian expatriate academics
Nigerian expatriates in Canada
21st-century Canadian women scientists
21st-century Nigerian women
Nigerian women scientists
People from Enugu State
Canada Research Chairs
Royal Society of Canada
Black Canadian women
Black Canadian scientists